The Chicago Motor Club, or CMC, is local chapter of the American Automobile Association in Chicago, Illinois. The CMC sponsored the first Elgin National Road Race in 1909. Growing from concern for the well-being of students walking to school, the CMC pioneered the concept of School Safety Patrols in 1920.

References

Bibliography
 Leviton, C. (1938) "Automobile Club Activities: The Problem from the Standpoint of the Bar", Law and Contemporary Problems. 5(1). Special edition: "The 'Unauthorized Practice of Law' Controversy", Winter. pp. 11–21.

External links
 Chicago Motor Club Building information and photographs.

History of Chicago
1902 establishments in Illinois
Automobile associations in the United States
Organizations based in Chicago